Ochre is the stage name of English electronic musician Christopher Leary. The name "Ochre" was originally adopted as the title for Leary's academic work while studying audio production at Newcastle College, as a variation of "Oaker", being the name of a street in Manchester where Leary spent his early childhood. He currently resides in Den Haag, The Netherlands. Leary also holds a Master's degree in music.

Ochre has had his music licensed for use in computer games, such as Sony's LittleBigPlanet 2, Psyonix's Whizzle, and Euclidean Crisis. Leary has also composed music for the animated documentary Centrefold, and has produced music for commercial projects by Google, Skoda, and Orange.

Discography

Albums
 AudioMicroDevice – 2001 (no label)
 A Midsummer Nice Dream – 2004, Toytronic Records
 Lemodie – 2006, Benbecula Records
 Like Dust of the Balance – 2009, Benbecula Records
 Early Learning – 2011, (no label)
 National Ignition – 2013, Aura Materia
 Beyond the Outer Loop – 2017, Aura Materia
 Project Caelus – 2018, Aura Materia
 Understory – 2020, Aura Materia
 An Eye to Windward – 2021

EP
 Death of an Aura EP – 2008, Benbecula Records
 Petl EP – 2009, Baselogic
 Isolette EP - 2015 Aura Materia

References

External links
 

Intelligent dance musicians
English electronic musicians
Living people
1979 births